Jake Charlie Nicholson (born 19 July 1992) is an English former footballer. He is a product of the West Ham United and Tottenham Hotspur youth academies. He has also represented England at under-19 level.

Career

Tottenham Hotspur 
Nicholson began his career with West Ham United, joining the club at the age of 10, but opted for a switch to Tottenham Hotspur in July 2009. After a year with the Under-18s, he was promoted to the first team ahead of the 2010–11 season.

Prior to making an appearance for the senior side, Nicholson joined Finnish club MyPa on a two-month loan in March 2011. The midfielder made his professional debut for Tottenham Hotspur on 25 August 2011, replacing Jake Livermore in a UEFA Europa League qualification play-off match against Hearts. However, it would go on to be his only appearance for the club before his release in June 2013.

Greenock Morton 
In the 2013-14 Nicholson returned to football in a move brokered by his friend, actor Tamer Hassan. He completed a switch to Scottish club Greenock Morton on 23 November, where he remained for three months.

AFC Wimbledon 
Nicholson returned to English football on 19 February 2014, when he joined League Two side AFC Wimbledon after a successful trial. Scoring on his debut in a 4–3 win against Cheltenham Town, the club were then deducted the three points after fielding Nicholson as an ineligible player. Nicholson later signed a new long-term deal with the club in May 2014. However, his contract was mutually terminated with the Dons in January 2015.

International 
Nicholson made a single appearance for the England Under-19 national team. He replaced George Thorne in the 74th minute in a 1–0 defeat to Germany on 8 February 2011.

References

External links

1992 births
Living people
Footballers from Harrow, London
English footballers
English expatriate footballers
Association football midfielders
England youth international footballers
Veikkausliiga players
Tottenham Hotspur F.C. players
Myllykosken Pallo −47 players
Expatriate footballers in Finland
Greenock Morton F.C. players
Walton Casuals F.C. players
Kingstonian F.C. players
Scottish Professional Football League players
AFC Wimbledon players
St Albans City F.C. players
Hayes & Yeading United F.C. players
English Football League players
Isthmian League players
National League (English football) players